Chuck Clanton is a former defensive back in the National Football League.

Biography
Clanton was born Cleveland Edward Clanton III on July 15, 1962 in Richmond, Virginia.

Career
After playing with the Birmingham Stallions of the United States Football League, Clanton was drafted by the Green Bay Packers in the second round of the 1984 NFL Supplemental Draft of USFL and CFL Players and played with the team that season. He played at the collegiate level at Auburn University.

In 1985, while playing for the USFL's Birmingham Stallions, Clanton set a professional football record by recording 16 interceptions in a single season, eclipsing the previous mark of 14 set in 1952 by Dick 'Night Train' Lane of the Los Angeles Rams.

See also
List of Green Bay Packers players

References

1962 births
Living people
Players of American football from Richmond, Virginia
American football defensive backs
Green Bay Packers players
Birmingham Stallions players
Auburn Tigers football players
National Football League replacement players